Fast Film is a 2003 Austrian/Luxembourgian film directed by Virgil Widrich.

Plot summary 
An homage to action films, it tells the story of a chase using scraps of other films as different types of animation (using 65,000 paper printouts of images from 400 live action films) illustrate a classic chase scene scenario: A woman is abducted and a man comes to her rescue, but during their escape they find themselves in the enemy's secret headquarters.

Films featured on Fast Film 
Carnival of Souls (1962)
Charade (1963)
Raiders of the Lost Ark (1981)
Singin' in the Rain (1952)
North By Northwest (1959)
The General (1926)
Ben-Hur (1959)
Gone with the Wind (1939)
Psycho (1960)
The Wild Bunch (1969)
The Man Who Knew Too Much (1956)
Bride of Frankenstein (1935)
The Time Machine (1960)
Dr. Strangelove (1964)
Midnight Cowboy (1969)
Jason and the Argonauts (1963)
Creature from the Black Lagoon (1954)
Videodrome (1983)
20,000 Leagues Under the Sea (1954)
To Catch a Thief (1955)
The Great Race (1965)
Breathless (1960)
The Maltese Falcon (1941)
Vertigo (1958)
Sunset Boulevard (1950)
House of Wax (1953)
Forbidden Planet (1956)

Accolades 
The film was nominated for a Palme d'Or for Best Short Film at the 2003 Cannes Film Festival. 

It was also part of the Animation Show of Shows.

References

External links 

Fast Film on director's official YouTube channel
Making of documentary also on official YouTube channel

2003 films
2003 animated films
2000s adventure thriller films
2000s animated short films
2000s chase films
Austrian animated short films
Luxembourgian animated films
Collage film
Rail transport films
Luxembourgian short films